The Shalya Parva, or the Book of Shalya, is the ninth of eighteen books of the Indian epic Mahabharata. Shalya Parva traditionally has 4 parts and 65 chapters. The critical edition of Shalya Parva has 4 parts and 64 chapters.

Shalya Parva describes the appointment of Shalya as the fourth commander-in-chief of the Kaurava alliance, on the 18th day of the Kurukshetra War. The parva recites Salya's death, how Duryodhana becomes mortally wounded and out of the entire Kaurava army, only 3 survive. Shalya parva also describes how Pandavas and Krishna are victorious in the war, but lament the enormous toll of the 18-day war on human lives on both sides. The book mentions the anger and hatred among survivors on the Kauravas side, particularly Duryodhana, Aswatthama, Kritavarman and Kripa.

Structure and chapters
This Parva (book) traditionally has 4 sub-parvas (parts or little books) and 65 adhyayas (sections, chapters). The following are the sub-parvas:

 1. Shalya-vadha Parva (Chapters: 1–22)
 2. Shalya Parva (Chapters: 23–27)
 3. Hrada-praveca Parva (Chapters: 28–29)
 4. Gadayuddha Parva (Chapters: 30–65)

After three commander-in-chiefs of Kauravas army slain, Shalya is appointed the leader. He too is killed, as is Shakuni. Millions more soldiers die on the last day of war. Duryodhana in anguish leaves the battlefield, and goes to a lake. Bhima meets him there, challenges him to a battle. Bhima mortally wounds Duryodhana by crushing his thighs and later, Duryodhana dies.

Out of 11 Akshauhinis of the Kauravas, only survivors are mortally injured Duryodhana along with Aswatthama, Kritavarman and Kripa. From Pandavas army, all five brothers, Krishna, 2000 chariots, 700 elephants, 5,000 horsemen and 10,000 foot soldiers survive. Shalya parva describes the war as over with a heavy toll on human lives, Pandavas are victorious, yet a desire for revenge is brewing in Duryodhana, Aswatthama, Kritavarman and Kripa.

English translations
Shalya Parva was composed in Sanskrit. Several translations of the book in English are available. Two translations from 19th century, now in public domain, are those by Kisari Mohan Ganguli and Manmatha Nath Dutt. The translations vary with each translator's interpretations.

Clay Sanskrit Library has published a 15 volume set of the Mahabharata which includes Shalya Parva. This translation is modern, by multiple authors and uses an old manuscript of the epic. The translation does not remove verses and chapters now widely believed to be spurious and smuggled into the epic in 1st or 2nd millennium AD.

Debroy, in 2011, notes that updated critical edition of Shalya Parva, after removing verses and chapters generally accepted so far as spurious and inserted into the original, has 4 parts, 64 adhyayas (chapters) and 3,541 shlokas (verses). Debroy has published a translated version of the critical edition of Shalya Parva in Volume 7 of his series.

Quotes and teachings

Shalya-vadha Parva, Chapter 1:

Gadayuddha Parva, Chapter 32:

Gadayuddha Parva, Chapter 60:

See also
Previous book of Mahabharata: Karna Parva
Next book of Mahabharata: Sauptika Parva

References

External links
Translation by Kisari Mohan Ganguli.
 Shalya Parva, Translation by Manmatha Nath Dutt
 Le Mahabharata, Translation in French, by H. Fauche (Paris, 1868)
 Shalya Parva in Sanskrit by Vyasadeva and commentary by Nilakantha (Editor: Kinjawadekar, 1929)

Parvas in Mahabharata
Kurukshetra War